Van Oekel's Discohoek was a Dutch television show, aired on VPRO in 1974-1975. The show, written by Wim T. Schippers and produced by Ellen Jens, starred Dolf Brouwers as the comedic character Sjef van Oekel, and parodied music television programs of the era. Artists lip-synched their songs, but were frequently interrupted and insulted by van Oekel. The show had a real coup when Captain Beefheart made an appearance. The show also starred one of the first TV appearances of Donna Summer, who later claimed that her breakthrough began with her performance of her song "Hostage", in which she gracefully went along with the scripted absurdity and chaos. The show inspired a similarly absurd show Plattenküche on the German WDR.

Due to the popularity of Sjef van Oekel a comic strip series was created around his character. Wim T. Schippers wrote the storylines, while Theo van den Boogaard drew it.

See also
 Sjef van Oekel

References

External links

1974 Dutch television series debuts
1975 Dutch television series endings
Dutch comedy television series
Wim T. Schippers
1970s Dutch television series
Dutch-language television shows
Dutch music television series
Television shows adapted into comics
Surreal comedy television series
Television controversies in the Netherlands
Obscenity controversies in television